Archibald Wilson (1890 – 1 July 1916) was a Scottish professional footballer who played in the Football League for Middlesbrough as an outside right. He also played in the Southern League for Southend United.

Personal life 
Wilson initially worked in a munitions factory during the First World War, before enlisting as a private in the London Scottish in 1915. He was killed on the first day of the Somme the following year, during the attack on the Gommecourt Salient. He is commemorated on the Thiepval Memorial.

Career statistics

Honours 
Southend United
Southern League Second Division second-place promotion: 1912–13

References

1890 births
1916 deaths
Scottish footballers
English Football League players
Association football outside forwards
British Army personnel of World War I
London Scottish soldiers
British military personnel killed in the Battle of the Somme
Nottingham Forest F.C. players
Tottenham Hotspur F.C. players
Southend United F.C. players
Middlesbrough F.C. players
Southern Football League players
Tottenham Hotspur F.C. wartime guest players
Southend United F.C. wartime guest players
Footballers from East Ayrshire
Scottish military personnel